Lopharia is a genus of fungi in the family Polyporaceae. The genus was circumscribed by Károly Kalchbrenner and Peter MacOwan in 1881.

Description
Fruit bodies of Lopharia fungi are crust like, to effused-reflexed (like a crust with the edges curled out to form caps). The sterile portion of the crust surface is tomentose, while the spore-bearing surface (the hymenium) is smooth or tuberculate. The colour ranges from greyish-white to cream to pale yellowish.

Lopharia has a dimitic hyphal system, meaning that it contains both generative and skeletal hyphae. The generative hyphae have clamp connections. Basidia are club shaped with four sterigmata, and have a clamp at the base. Spores are cylindrical to ellipsoid in shape with a smooth surface. They are hyaline (translucent), and have oily contents.

Species
A 2008 estimate placed 13 species in Lopharia. , Index Fungorum accepts 15 species:
Lopharia albida Rick (1938)
Lopharia americana  Rick (1928)
Lopharia amethystea  (Hjortstam & Ryvarden) A.L.Welden (2010)
Lopharia bambusae  Rick (1960)
Lopharia cinerascens  (Schwein.) G.Cunn. (1956)
Lopharia cystidiosa  (Rehill & B.K.Bakshi) Boidin (1969)
Lopharia javanica  Henn. & E.Nyman (1900)
Lopharia lilacina  (Berk. & Broome) A.L.Welden (2010)
Lopharia ochracea  G.Cunn. (1963)
Lopharia papyracea  (Bres.) D.A.Reid (1957)
Lopharia papyrina  (Mont.) Boidin (1959)
Lopharia pilosiuscula  (Hjortstam & Ryvarden) A.L.Welden (2010)
Lopharia pseudocinerascens  Boidin & Gilles (2003)
Lopharia rimosissima  Rick (1960)
Lopharia rugulosa  (Berk. & M.A.Curtis) Hjortstam (1995)

References

Polyporaceae
Polyporales genera
Taxa described in 1881